The Rangers was a volunteer unit of the British Army, originally formed in 1860. It provided a detachment for service in the Second Boer War, saw intensive action on the Western Front in the First World War (including the Battles of the Somme and Passchendaele), and served as motorised infantry during the Second World War during the campaigns in Greece and the Western Desert.

Early history
The enthusiasm for the Volunteer movement following an invasion scare in 1859 saw the creation of many Rifle Volunteer Corps composed of part-time soldiers eager to supplement the Regular British Army in time of need. One such unit was the Central London Rifle Rangers formed in 1859 at Gray's Inn, London, from members of the legal profession. It officially came into existence on 30 April 1860 and was numbered as the 40th Middlesex Rifle Volunteer Corps. It was included in the 3rd Administrative Battalion of Middlesex RVCs. The unit drilled in the precincts of Gray's Inn and the headquarters (HQ) was established first at Field Court and then at South Square at Gray's Inn.

In 1861, the corps was made independent of the 3rd Administrative Battalion and absorbed the single-company 35th (Enfield) Middlesex RVC whose commanding officer (CO), Alfred Plantagenet F.C. Somerset (formerly of the 13th Light Infantry), became lieutenant-colonel of the combined battalion, which was authorised to expand to eight companies in 1862. Its uniform was based on that of the Kings Royal Rifle Corps (KRRC).

Sir Alfred Plantagenet Frederick Charles Somerset (1829–1915) was the grandson of Henry Somerset, 5th Duke of Beaufort and nephew of Field Marshal Lord Raglan. His second-in-command was Major the Hon Hallyburton Campbell (1829–1918) son of the Lord Chancellor, John Campbell, 1st Baron Campbell, and formerly of the East India Company's service.

The first Honorary Colonel, appointed in 1862, was General Sir James Yorke Scarlett, son of James Scarlett, 1st Baron Abinger, a former Attorney General for England and Wales. General Scarlett was Major Campbell's uncle, and another nephew, Leopold James York Campbell Scarlett (1847–88), was commissioned as a lieutenant in the Rangers in 1863 (he later became Lt-Col in the Scots Guards).

Alfred Somerset left the battalion in 1866 to take command of the 2nd Tower Hamlets Militia, and was succeeded as Lt-Col by Hallyburton Campbell. Campbell's elder brother, William Campbell, 2nd Baron Stratheden and Campbell, became Hon Colonel after Gen Scarlett's death in 1872. Lieutenant-Colonel Campbell (who succeeded as 3rd Lord Stratheden and Campbell in 1893) left the battalion in 1872.

When the Cardwell Reforms introduced 'Localisation of the Forces' in 1873, the 40th Middlesex was brigaded, together with several other London and Middlesex Volunteer and Militia battalions, in Brigade No 49 (Middlesex and Metropolitan) under the Royal Fusiliers. The Volunteer units of these brigades met once a year for a training camp.

Reform

The battalion was equipped with the Enfield Rifle Musket, later the Snider-Enfield, and used a 600-yard range at Tottenham Park. After Lt-Col Campbell left, the battalion was commanded by a succession of officers, including Lt-Col Adrian Hope, who left to command the London Rifle Brigade, and Lt-Col Henry Hozier, a former staff officer on the British Expedition to Abyssinia and war correspondent of The Times. The unit's numbers began to fall until 1875, when it was reinvigorated under the command of Lt-Col Howard Vincent, later Sir Howard Vincent, first director of the Criminal Investigation Department at Scotland Yard. Vincent instigated a conference of Volunteer COs in January 1878 to discuss reform of the Volunteer Force.

In the subsequent reforms, the Rangers were renumbered as the 22nd Middlesex RVC (Central London Rangers) in 1880 and became a Volunteer Battalion of the Royal Fusiliers the following year. This affiliation was changed to the KRRC a year later; officially the Rangers were the 8th VB KRRC, but did not change their title. The Adjutant of the battalion was a Regular officer seconded from the Royal Fusiliers, then from the KRRC. These included Capt (later Col) Sir Thomas Pilkington, 12th Bt, who had served at the Battle of Tell El Kebir, and Maj Lord Robert Manners (killed in action in 1917), son of the Duke of Rutland.

Vincent resigned the command upon his appointment to Scotland Yard, and was succeeded by Lt-Col Sir Henry Malet, late of the Grenadier Guards, and then in 1881 by the battalion's major, William Alt. In June 1882, Lt-Col Alt purchased two five-barrel Nordenfelt machine guns and designed a suitable carriage for them. The Rangers claimed to be the first infantry battalion of the British Army to use machine guns, but were not allowed to use them on parade. Eventually, permission was granted for experimental use in training at Aldershot. Possession of machine guns by Volunteer units was finally authorised by the War Office in October 1883.

During Alt's command, the Rangers recruited two companies from employees of the Gas Light and Coke Company's Beckton Gas Works, and a signal section was established in 1886. Between 1891 and 1899 a Cadet Corps at Mayall College, Herne Hill, was attached to the battalion.

The Stanhope Memorandum of December 1888 introduced a Mobilisation Scheme for Volunteer units, which would assemble in their own brigades at key points in case of war. In peacetime, these brigades provided a structure for collective training. The Rangers were assigned to the North London Brigade.

Second Boer War
After 'Black Week' in December 1899, the War Office accepted the offer of the Lord Mayor of London, Sir Alfred Newton, to raise a force (the City Imperial Volunteers (CIVs)) from among the London Volunteer units for service in the Second Boer War. The Rangers provided a detachment of one officer (Lt Brian Alt, son of Lt-Col Alt) and 26 other ranks, who served in H Company of the CIVs between February and October 1900. Lieutenant Alt was killed at the Battle of Diamond Hill on 12 June, the only officer casualty suffered by the CIVs.

Other members of the battalion served with the Imperial Yeomanry (IY), including Charles Bromfield, who had been commissioned from the ranks of the Rangers as a captain in the 87th Company of the Imperial Yeomanry and died of wounds received in action near Boshof in February 1902.

For providing these contingents, the Rangers were awarded the Battle honour South Africa 1900–02. After the war, the Rangers' battalion HQ moved from South Square at Gray's Inn to 3 Henry Street, Grays Inn.

Territorial Force

When the Volunteers were subsumed into the new Territorial Force (TF) under the Haldane Reforms of 1908, the Rangers were transferred from the KRRC to the new all-Territorial London Regiment, as 12th (County of London) Battalion, London Regiment (The Rangers).

On 25 June 1908, the battalion took over the Drill Hall in Chenies Street. Designed by Samuel Knight, this had been built in 1882–3 for the Bloomsbury Rifles (19th Middlesex RVC). In 1908, that corps merged with Queen Victoria's Rifles (1st Middlesex RVC) to form the 9th Bn London Regiment, which continued to use the QVRs' HQ at Davies Street while the Rangers took over the building in Chenies Street.

The North London Brigade, including the 12th Battalion, became the 3rd London Brigade in the 1st London Division of the TF.

First World War
On the outbreak of the First World War in August 1914, the Rangers formed part of 3rd London Brigade within 1st London Division. It was mobilised and moved to Bullswater, then to Crowborough in September and Roehampton in December. In the interim, during October 1914, it was assigned to guard Waterloo-North Camp (Aldershot) railway.

On 25 December 1914, it left its division on landing at Le Havre. On 8 February 1915, it was put under the command of 84th Brigade within 28th Division. On 8 May 1915 the battalion took part in the battle of Frezenburg Ridge, resulting in its almost complete destruction.  At the end of the day it mustered only 53 men - all officers being either killed, wounded or captured.  The battalion was transferred to GHQ Troops on 20 May to form a composite unit with the London Regiment's 1/5th and 1/13th Battalions–that only lasted until 11 August, when the three battalions regained their original identity. On 12 February 1916, it was moved into 168th Brigade within 56th (London) Division.

The battalion switched brigades on 31 January 1918, moving to 175th Brigade within 58th Division–at the same time it absorbed its duplicate battalion, 2/12th Battalion, which had been formed in September 1914.

Interwar years
The unit was formally transferred to the corps of the KRRC on 7 July 1916, though it also remained a battalion of the London Regiment until 1937, when it was renamed The Rangers, The King's Royal Rifle Corps.

Second World War
Upon the outbreak of the Second World War in September 1939, both battalions were part of the 3rd London Brigade. On 22 March 1941, while serving with the 20th Armoured Brigade, it became the 9th Battalion, King's Royal Rifle Corps (The Rangers).

Post war
In 1947, the battalion became The Rangers, The Rifle Brigade (Prince Consort's Own). In 1960, the Rangers amalgamated with the London Rifle Brigade to form London Rifle Brigade/Rangers.

Traditions
Because of its initial links with Gray's Inn, the regiment claimed descent from the Inns of Court Volunteers of 1780. The Rangers were actually founded to accommodate members of the Inns of Court who did not wish to join the exclusive 23rd (Inns of Court) Middlesex RVC, which had a better claim to descent from The Devil's Own.

The regiment's motto, Excel, was derived from the Roman numerals (XL) of its original numbering as the 40th Middlesex RVC.

Uniform and insignia
On formation, the Rangers adopted the uniform of the Kings Royal Rifle Corps (KRRC), a Rifle green tunic with scarlet facings (except the KRRC's scarlet piping down the front edge of the tunic). A black Shako was worn with a black ball tuft and a silver plated shako plate bearing an eight-pointed star with a bugle, the number XL and the motto Excel, surmounted by a bronzed crown. The waist belt, pouch and bayonet frog were in black leather. Until 1875, dismounted as well as mounted officers wore leather knee boots with the trousers tucked into them. The Pioneers wore a Bearskin of the Guards' pattern.

In 1878–9, a black cloth helmet with bronze fittings was adopted, and by 1885 was in use by all members of the battalion. The helmet and pouch plates were changed to a Maltese cross pattern to resemble the KRRC's. A new Rifle pattern small Busby was adopted in place of the helmet in 1892.

During the 20th Century, the bronze cap badge, like that of the KRRC, was worn on a scarlet backing.

Memorials

The Rangers' First World War memorial was erected in North Crescent, Chenies Street, close to the drill hall. After the Second World War, the battle honours for that war were added to the memorial. The battalion is also named on the listed on the City and County of London Troops Memorial in front of the Royal Exchange, with architectural design by Sir Aston Webb and sculpture by Alfred Drury. The right-hand (southern) bronze figure flanking this memorial depicts an infantryman representative of the various London infantry units. Each unit listed on the memorial was given a bronze plaque; that for the 12th Londons (Rangers) is held at the Army Reserve Centre in West Ham.

Battle Honours
The Rangers were awarded the following Battle honours; those listed in Bold were chosen to be carried on the regimental insignia, because Rifle regiments do not carry Colours:
 South Africa 1900–02
 First World War: Ypres 1915 '17, Gravenstafel, St Julien, Frezenberg, Somme 1916 '18, Albert 1916 '18, Ginchy, Flers-Courcellette, Morval, Le Transloy, Arras 1917, Scarpe 1917, Langemarck 1918, Menin Road, Polygon Wood, Passchendales, Cambrai 1917, Villers Brettonneux, Amiens, Bapaume 1918,, Hindenburg Line, Épehy, Pursuit to Mons, France and Flanders 1915–18
 Second World War: Gazala, Retima, Bir Hacheim, Defence of Alamein Line, Ruweisat, Fuka Airfield, North Africa 1942, Veve, Proasteion, Greece 1941, Crete, Canea, Retimo, Middle East 1941'Honorary Colonels
 General the Hon Sir James Yorke Scarlett, appointed 1862.
 William Campbell, 2nd Baron Stratheden and Campbell, appointed 1872.
 Major C.W. Cradock, Royal Fusiliers, former adjutant of the battalion, appointed 1901.
 Col Willam Alt, CB, former CO of the battalion, appointed 1907.
 Sir Corbet Woodall, Governor of the Gas Light and Coke Company, appointed 1909.Wheeler-Holohan & Wyatt, p. 12.
 Lieutenant-General Sir Louis Bols, KCB, KCMG, DSO, appointed 1919
 Sir David Milne-Watson, 1st Bt, Managing Director of the Gas Light and Coke Company, appointed 1924
 Field Marshal Harold Alexander, 1st Earl Alexander of Tunis, KG, GCB, GCMG, GCVO, CSI, DSO, MC, appointed 1949
 Colonel Sir W. James Waterlow, 2nd Bt, MBE, TD, appointed 1952

 See also 

 Connaught Rangers

Notes

References
 Anon, Regimental Badges and Service Caps, London: George Philip & Sons, 1941.
 Maj A.F. Becke,History of the Great War: Order of Battle of Divisions, Part 2a: The Territorial Force Mounted Divisions and the 1st-Line Territorial Force Divisions (42–56), London: HM Stationery Office, 1935/Uckfield: Naval & Military Press, 2007, .
 Ian F.W. Beckett, Riflemen Form: A Study of the Rifle Volunteer Movement 1859–1908, Aldershot: Ogilby Trusts, 1982, .
 Burke's Peerage, Baronetage and Knightage, 100th Edn, London, 1953.
 Bridget Cherry & Nikolaus Pevsner, The Buildings of England: London 4: North, London: Yae University Press, 2002, .
 Col John K. Dunlop, The Development of the British Army 1899–1914, London: Methuen, 1938.
 Lt-Col James Moncrieff Grierson (Col Peter S. Walton, ed.), Scarlet into Khaki: The British Army on the Eve of the Boer War, London: Sampson Low, 1899/London: Greenhill, 1988, .
 Edward M. Spiers, The Army and Society 1815–1914, London: Longmans, 1980, .
 Ray Westlake, Tracing the Rifle Volunteers, Barnsley: Pen and Sword, 2010, .
 Capt A.V. Wheeler-Holohan & Capt C.M.G. Wyatt (eds), The Rangers' Historical Records from 1859 to the Conclusion of the Great War'', London, 1921/Uckfield: Naval & Military Press, 2003, .

External sources
 Mark Conrad, The British Army, 1914 (archive site)
 The Long, Long Trail
 The Peerage.com
 Land Forces of Britain, the Empire and Commonwealth (Regiments.org) - archive site
 The Regimental Warpath 1914–1918 (archive site)
 Stepping Forward London: A Tribute to the Volunteer Military Reservists ad Supporting Auxiliaries of Greater London.

Battalions of the London Regiment (1908–1938)
Military units and formations established in 1860
Military units and formations disestablished in 1960
Military units and formations in London
British Army Rangers